William Lee (born 2 December 1941) is the bishop emeritus of the Diocese of Waterford and Lismore in Ireland.

Lee was born in Newport, County Tipperary. He is the eldest of the five children of John and Delia Lee, who ran a public house and auctioneering business in the town.

Lee received his early education at the local Convent of Mercy and Boys' National Schools and later went to Rockwell College. He studied for the priesthood at St Patrick's College, Maynooth and was ordained for the priesthood in the Diocese of Cashel and Emly on 19 June 1966. Lee studied in canon law at Maynooth, where he received a doctorate in 1969. He then served for two years in the large parish of Finglas West, Dublin. He also studied for a time at the Pontifical Gregorian University, Rome.

Lee was appointed Professor of Philosophy and bursar at St Patrick's College, Thurles. For 15 years he was Director of the Catholic Marriage Advisory Council of Cashel Diocese. He also served on the Cork Regional Marriage Tribunal. He was President of St Patrick's College, Thurles from 1987 to 1993.

Lee was consecrated Bishop of the Diocese of Waterford and Lismore on 25 July 1993. In 1998, Lee was appointed Secretary of the Irish Episcopal Conference.

In March 2010 it was reported that Bishop Lee waited two years in the mid-1990s before telling police about complaints from two people in connection with allegations of child abuse. He did not explain why he had taken so long to report the matter.

On 1 October 2013 it was announced that Pope Francis had accepted the resignation of Bishop Lee due to on going health problems.

References

People from County Tipperary
1941 births
Roman Catholic bishops of Waterford and Lismore
Living people
Alumni of St Patrick's College, Maynooth